Nicole Dünki is a Swiss female curler.

At the national level, she is a 2010 Swiss mixed champion curler and two-time Swiss women's bronze medallist (2013, 2014).

Teams

Women's

Mixed

References

External links

Living people

Swiss female curlers
Swiss curling champions
Place of birth missing (living people)
21st-century Swiss women
1989 births